Les Boukakes is a French rock group formed in 1999. 
Their music is a mixture of ethnic and cultural sounds across a variety of genres: stirring rock, groove, electronic, raï, and gnawa.

They were nominated for the BBC Awards for World Music 2007.

Discography

Albums
2012: Punky Halal
2008: Marra
2005: Bledi
2001: Makach Mouch'kil

References

en musique
Les Boukakes - Couleur Café || 29-30 June / 1 July 2012 // TOUR & TAXIS

French rock music groups
Musical groups established in 1999
1999 establishments in France